Ofélia Ramos Anunciato or Ofélia (December 27, 1924 – October 26, 1998) was a well-known Brazilian chef. She hosted cooking shows on TV, like A cozinha Maravilhosa de Ofélia. She began her career as a personality chef by publishing recipes in 1958 in the newspapers A Tribuna (Santos, São Paulo) and A Gazeta (also in São Paulo). Ofélia, A Taste of Brazil is a translation from Portuguese by Julie Martin (Melhoramentos/2000).

References

External links
 A cozinheira maravilhosa - Gula magazine
 A Culinarista - NGTCOM
 12. - Best Cookbook tied to Television (Finalists for the Best in the World/2006)
 12. - Best Cookbook tied to Television (Finalists for the Best in the World/2006)
 Ofelia's Handmade e-commerce marketplace

1924 births
1998 deaths
People from São Paulo (state)
Brazilian people of Italian descent
Brazilian people of Portuguese descent
Brazilian chefs